Nerovnovka is a rural locality (a sloboda) in Stepnyanskoye Rural Settlement, Olkhovatsky District, Voronezh Oblast, Russia. The population was 695 as of 2010. There are 9 streets.

Geography 
Nerovnovka is located 21 km southwest of Olkhovatka (the district's administrative centre) by road. Rodina Geroya is the nearest rural locality.

References 

Rural localities in Olkhovatsky District